Hluboká may refer to places in the Czech Republic:

Hluboká (Chrudim District), a municipality and village in Pardubice Region
Hluboká nad Vltavou, a town in the South Bohemian Region
Hluboká Castle, a castle in Hluboká nad Vltavou
Hluboká, a village and part of Kdyně in the Plzeň Region
Hluboká, a village and part of Krucemburk in the Vysočina Region
Hluboká, officially Liberec XXVIII-Hluboká, a village and part of Liberec in the Liberec Region
Hluboká, a village and part of Milhostov in the Karlovy Vary Region
Hluboká, a village and part of Nalžovice in the Central Bohemian Region
Hluboká, a village and part of Sruby in the Pardubice Region
Hluboká, a village and part of Trhová Kamenice in the Pardubice Region
Hluboká, a village and part of Žihle in the Plzeň Region